This is a list of alumni of the Punjabi University, listed in alphabetical order by first name. The Punjabi University, Patiala founded in 1962, has among its alumni many who have become notable, including Member of parliament, Lok Sabha, members of the Punjab Legislative Assembly and several famous people in areas such as Punjabi literature, social sciences, economics, philosophy, and music. More recently, due to expansion into areas of technology, it has also produced notable computer scientists.

B
 Baldev Raj Gupta, languages faculty
 Balraj Pandit, Theatre faculty
 Binnu Dhillon

D
 Dalip Kaur Tiwana, famous Punjabi writer and faculty
 Devinder Shory
 Davinder Singh

G

 Gagandeep Kaur, Indian archer
 Gulzar Singh Sandhu, journalism faculty
 Gurdas Maan, Punjabi singer
 Gurpreet Singh Lehal, computer science faculty

H
 Hardiljeet Singh 'Lalli', linguistics faculty

J
 Jagmeet Singh Brar

K
 Kirpal Singh Narang, former Vice-chancellor
 Kulwinder Billa

N
 Navneet Kaur Dhillon, Miss India 2013
 Navnindra Behl, Theatre faculty
 Nirmal Rishi

O
 Om Puri

P
 Pamma Dumewal
 Pammi Bai, folk singer
 Parminder Singh Dhindsa

R
 Rasneet Lobana
 Rachhpal Singh Aujla, MBBS passout of year 1958 from first batch of Government Medical College, Patiala 
 Raj Babbar
 Ram Gopal Bajaj, Department of Dramatic Arts
 Rana Ranbir
 Ravi Deep

S

 Samuel John
 Sanju Solanki
 Sardar Anjum, famous poet and Urdu faculty 
 Sardara Singh Johl
 Sunita Dhir, Punjabi film actress and Theatre & Television faculty  
 Surjit Patar, famous Punjabi poet
 Surjit Singh Sethi, founder of Speech, Drama and Music Department (Department of Theatre and Television)
 Dr. S S Joshi, he was Head of Department of Anthropological Linguistics & Department of Lexicography. He also served as Dean Language Faculty, Director Planning, Director Audio Visual Research Centre

See also
 Punjabi University
 Punjabi University Guru Kashi Campus

References

External links
 The Punjabi University of Alumni Association

Punjabi University
Punjabi University